Nocardiopsis trehalosi  is a bacterium from the genus of Nocardiopsis which has been isolated from soil.

References

Further reading

External links
Type strain of Nocardiopsis trehalosi at BacDive -  the Bacterial Diversity Metadatabase	

Actinomycetales
Bacteria described in 1981